The  was an express electric multiple unit (EMU) train type introduced in 1963 by Japanese National Railways (JNR).

History
During the early 1960s, the Chūō Main Line and Shinetsu Line were electrified, requiring new EMUs for the express services. New powerful trains were required, as the earlier 153 series trains were designed for operation in flat, warm areas.

Differences between 153 series and 165 series
 Motor output increased from 100 kW to 120 kW
 Proofing against heavy snow and cold weather

Individual car types (original)
 KuMoHa 165: Motorized cab car. 76 seats. 145 cars were built from 1963 to 1970. Coupled to MoHa 164.
 KuHa 165: Cab car. 76 seats. 210 cars were built from 1963 to 1970.
 MoHa 164: Motorized car with pantograph, air compressor and motor-generator. 84 seats. 166 cars were built from 1963 to 1970.
 Moha 165: Motorized car. 84 seats. 21 cars were built from 1963 to 1969. Coupled to MoHa 164.
 SaHa 164: Intermediate trailer car. 56 seats. Only two cars were built in 1966. With kiosk.
 SaHa 165: Intermediate trailer car. 84 seats. 11 cars were built in 1969.
 SaRo 165: Intermediate trailer car. Green car.
 SaHaShi 165: Intermediate trailer car. Buffet and seating. 36 seats. 12 cars were built in 1963. Soba corner instead of 153 series Sushi corner.

Joyful Train conversions
A number of 165 series trains were converted for use as Joyful Train sets including the following.
 Nanohana: First EMU-based Joyful Train, introduced in March 1986 and withdrawn August 1998.
 Panorama Express Alps: 3+3-car set converted in 1986 for use on the Chūō Main Line and the Ōito Line. This train was withdrawn in 2001, and sold to Fuji Kyuko in 2002, becoming the Fujikyu 2000 series Fujisan Express.
 Shuttle Maihama
 Yū Yū Tōkai

Resale
Nine withdrawn 165 series cars were sold to the Chichibu Railway in 1992 and converted to become Chichibu Railway 3000 series 3-car sets for use on express services.

Preserved examples
 KuHa 165-120, stored for a long period at Mino-Ōta Depot in Minokamo, Gifu, before being moved by road to Hamamatsu Depot in February 2013
 KuMoHa 165-108, (built 1966 by Tokyu Car) at SCMaglev and Railway Park, Nagoya
 MoHa 164-72, stored at Mino-Ōta Depot in Minokamo, Gifu
 SaRo 165-106, (built 1967 by Imperial Car) at SCMaglev and Railway Park, Nagoya

See also
 167 series
 169 series

References

External links

 

Electric multiple units of Japan
East Japan Railway Company
Central Japan Railway Company
West Japan Railway Company
Train-related introductions in 1963
1500 V DC multiple units of Japan